The 2003–04 season was Fulham's third consecutive season in the top league of English football, the Barclaycard Premiership. The club was managed by former player Chris Coleman, who replaced Jean Tigana at the end of the 2002–03 season.

Fulham were near the top of the table after the first few months of the season after a great start to the campaign and consistently remained in the top half throughout the course of the season. They ended up finishing in ninth position, only four points behind fifth-placed Newcastle United. It was a great debut season for Chris Coleman as manager, particularly as the club had to cope for half of the season without top goalscorer, Louis Saha, who left for Manchester United.

Kit and sponsorship
Fulham's last deal with kit supplier Adidas came to an end on 11 May 2003. It was announced on June that dabs.com would be the kits sponsor in a two-year agreement. On June it was announced the new kit would be produced by Puma.

Players

First-team squad
Squad at end of season

Left club during season

Reserve squad

Statistics

Appearances and goals

|-
! colspan=14 style=background:#dcdcdc; text-align:center| Goalkeepers

|-
! colspan=14 style=background:#dcdcdc; text-align:center| Defenders

|-
! colspan=14 style=background:#dcdcdc; text-align:center| Midfielders

|-
! colspan=14 style=background:#dcdcdc; text-align:center| Forwards

|-
! colspan=14 style=background:#dcdcdc; text-align:center| Players transferred out during the season

Starting 11
Considering starts in all competitions
Considering a 4-4-2 formation
 GK: #1,  Edwin van der Sar, 43
 RB: #2,  Moritz Volz, 37
 CB: #16,  Zat Knight, 35
 CB: #24,  Alain Goma, 29
 LB: #34,  Carlos Bocanegra, 19 (#17,  Martin Djetou, has 24 starts)
 RM: #10,  Lee Clark, 27
 CM: #23,  Sean Davis, 28
 CM: #5,  Sylvain Legwinski, 35
 LM: #14,  Steed Malbranque, 44
 CF: #8,  Louis Saha, 21
 CF: #11,  Luís Boa Morte, 37

Transfers

Summer

In

Out

January

In

Out

Club

Management

Other information

Fulham used Queens Park Rangers' ground whilst Craven Cottage was being redeveloped

Competitions

Premier League

Season statistics

Matches

Pre-season friendlies

Results

Premier League

League Cup

FA Cup

References

Notes

External links
Fulham's official website
Fulham on BBC Sport

Fulham F.C. seasons
Fulham